Cathrine Laudrup-Dufour (born 2 January 1992) is a Danish Olympic dressage horse rider. Representing Denmark, she competed at the 2016 Summer Olympics in Rio de Janeiro where she finished 13th in the individual and 6th in the team competition. At the 2020 Summer Olympics in Tokyo, she finished 4th in both the individual and team dressage events.

Sports career
Dufour started riding at age 5 and joined the Danish national pony dressage team at age 12. She has won several medals at the Danish and European junior and young riders championships.

She has studied Leisure Management, Sports Management for a year at University College Zealand.

Olympics Results

Business Interests 

While studying Cathrine started up her own company Cathrine Dressage, through which she trains young riders and educates horses. She also develops training videos for the platform Cathrine Stream.

Cathrine Dufour is a brand-ambassador for the Danish bag brand Adax and collaborates with several other brands, including Trolle Company, Cavalleria Toscana and Ingdam's.

Personal life
Dufour is married to Rasmine Laudrup, daughter of former professional footballer Brian Laudrup. They live on an equestrian estate in Fredensborg north of Copenhagen.

Horses
 Atterupgaards Cassidy
 Bohemian
 Eternity
 ADAX'Sauterness
 Perfect Brilliant
 Vamos Amigos

References

External links
 
 Cathrine Dufour official website

Living people
1992 births
Danish female equestrians
Danish dressage riders
Equestrians at the 2016 Summer Olympics
Equestrians at the 2020 Summer Olympics
Olympic equestrians of Denmark
People from Lejre Municipality
Danish LGBT sportspeople
21st-century Danish LGBT people
Sportspeople from Region Zealand